"Runnin' Behind" is a song written by Mark D. Sanders and Ed Hill, and recorded by American country music artist Tracy Lawrence. It was released in June 1992 as the third single from his debut album, Sticks and Stones. It peaked at number 4 on the U.S. Billboard Hot Country Singles & Tracks chart and at number 6 on the Canadian RPM Country Tracks chart. This song was also featured on Tracy Lawrence Live and Unplugged and The Very Best of Tracy Lawrence.

Critical reception
Deborah Evans Price, of Billboard magazine reviewed the song favorably, saying that Lawrence delivers the "swing ditty and its working class storyline with snap."

Music video
The music video features Tracy and his band playing on stage at a Siesta Key.. It switches from evening to night.

Chart performance
"Runnin' Behind" debuted at number 63 on the U.S. Billboard Hot Country Singles & Tracks for the week of June 20, 1992.

Year-end charts

References

1992 singles
1991 songs
Tracy Lawrence songs
Songs written by Mark D. Sanders
Song recordings produced by James Stroud
Atlantic Records singles
Songs written by Ed Hill